The masked garden eel (Heteroconger lentiginosus) is a type of marine conger found in the Pacific Ocean.

References 

Heteroconger
Fish described in 1999
Taxa named by James Erwin Böhlke
Taxa named by John Ernest Randall